Tomorrow the World is a board game published in 1989 by 3W.

Contents
Tomorrow the World is a game in which the Axis powers won World War II and divided up the world between them.

Reception
Martin Croft reviewed Tomorrow the World for Games International magazine, and gave it 1 star (a turkey) out of 5, and stated that "All in all, a disappointment. I like alternate history fiction, because as a wargamer I enjoy exploring 'What Might Have Beens'. But I prefer to feel that a bit of effort has gone into it."

References

3W games
Board games introduced in 1989